Nitrilotriacetic acid (NTA) is the aminopolycarboxylic acid with the formula  N(CH2CO2H)3. It is a colourless solid that is used as a chelating agent, which forms coordination compounds with metal ions (chelates) such as Ca2+, Co2+, Cu2+, and Fe3+.

Production and use
Nitrilotriacetic acid is commercially available as the free acid and as the sodium salt. It is produced from ammonia, formaldehyde, and sodium cyanide or hydrogen cyanide. Worldwide capacity is estimated at 100 thousand tonnes per year.  NTA is also cogenerated as an impurity in the synthesis of EDTA, arising from reactions of the ammonia coproduct.  Older routes to NTA included alkylation of ammonia with chloroacetic acid and oxidation of triethanolamine.

Coordination chemistry and applications
NTA is a tripodal tetradentate trianionic ligand.

The uses of NTA are similar to those of EDTA, both being chelating agents.  It is used for water softening and as a replacement to sodium and potassium triphosphate in detergents, and cleansers.

In one application, NTA as a chelating agent removes Cr, Cu, and As from wood that had been treated with chromated copper arsenate.

Laboratory uses
In the laboratory, this compound is used in complexometric titrations. A variant of NTA is used for protein isolation and purification in the His-tag method. The modified NTA is used to immobilize nickel on a solid support. This allows purification of proteins containing a tag consisting of six histidine residues at either terminus.

The his-tag binds the metal of metal chelator complexes. Previously, iminodiacetic acid was used for that purpose. Now, nitrilotriacetic acid is more commonly used.

For laboratory uses Ernst Hochuli et al. 1987 coupled the NTA ligand and Nickel-ions to agarose beads. This Ni-NTA Agarose is the most used tool to purify his tagged proteins via affinity chromatography.

Toxicity and environment
Nitriloacetic acid can cause eye, skin, and respiratory tract irritation; and can cause kidney and bladder damage. The compound is anticipated to have the potential to cause human cancers.

In contrast to EDTA, NTA is easily biodegradable and is almost completely removed during wastewater treatment.  The environmental impacts of NTA are minimal.  Despite widespread use in cleaning products, the concentration in the water supply is too low to have a sizeable impact on human health or environmental quality.

References

Amines
Acetic acids
Chelating agents
IARC Group 2B carcinogens
Tripodal ligands